Gaël Morel (born 25 September 1972) is a French film director, screenwriter and actor.

Life and career 
Morel was born in Villefranche-sur-Saône, Rhône, France, a town of 30,000 inhabitants outside Lyon. He grew up in the nearby village of Lacenas in the Villefranche district.

At the age of 15, Morel left home to pursue film studies in Lyon, and later moved to Paris. There he met French director André Téchiné, who cast him in the lead role of François in the multi-César Award-winning 1994 film Wild Reeds (Les Roseaux sauvages), which brought him fame, earning much critical praise for his performance and a 1995 César nomination for Most Promising Young Actor.

While his Wild Reeds co-stars Élodie Bouchez and Stéphane Rideau have both gone on to successful acting careers (he has often cast them in his own films), Morel has chosen to write and direct.

Filmography

As actor

As director

Awards 
 1995 - César nomination : Meilleur Espoir Masculin (Most Promising Young Actor) for Les Roseaux sauvages
 2002 - FIPRESCI Prize, Toronto International Film Festival, for Under Another Sky (Les chemins de l'oued)

References

External links

1972 births
Living people
French male film actors
French film directors
French male screenwriters
French screenwriters
People from Villefranche-sur-Saône
20th-century French male actors
21st-century French male actors